Romaine Waite is a Canadian actor. His most notable works include The Mist and Star Trek: Discovery.

Early life 
Waite was born in Montego Bay, Jamaica. He moved to Canada and spent his adolescent years in Brampton, Ontario.

Career 
Waite's acting career began with short and independent films. He had supporting roles on Murdoch Mysteries (TV Series, CBC, 2016) alongside Yannick Bisson, Taken (TV Series, NBC, 2018) alongside Jennifer Beals, and Privates Eyes with Jason Priestley.

On the big screen, he portrayed Greg Cole in the Lifetime movie The Clark Sisters: First Ladies of Gospel, Steve in the horror indie Antisocial (Breakthrough Entertainment, 2013) and John Burke in the action-packed drama, Scratch (2015). He has also worked with Gerard Butler in A Family Man. In addition, Waite has been a part of live stage performances, including as Aaron Levinsky in Nuts (Scarborough Village Theatre, 2014) and Rick in Killcreek (Toronto Fringe Festival, 2013).

Filmography

Films

Television

References

External links 
 

Living people
Canadian male television actors
Canadian male film actors
Year of birth missing (living people)
Black Canadian male actors
Canadian male child actors
Canadian people of Jamaican descent
People from Montego Bay
21st-century Canadian male actors